Cristian Gavra (born 3 April 1993) is a Romanian professional footballer who plays as a forward for Ripensia Timișoara.

International career

Gavra played with the Romania U-19 national team at the 2011 European Under-19 Championship, which took place in Romania.

Honours
Viitorul Constanța
Liga III: 2009–10

Gaz Metan Mediaș
Liga II: 2015–16

External links
 
 

1993 births
Living people
Sportspeople from Arad, Romania
Romanian footballers
Association football forwards
FC Viitorul Constanța players
CS Gaz Metan Mediaș players
FC Universitatea Cluj players
LPS HD Clinceni players
FC Ripensia Timișoara players
Liga I players
Liga II players
Romania youth international footballers
Romania under-21 international footballers